{{DISPLAYTITLE:Rhaetian Railway ABe 4/4 III}}

The Rhaetian Railway ABe 4/4 III is a class of metre gauge electric multiple unit railcars of the Rhaetian Railway (RhB), which is the main railway network in the Canton of Graubünden, Switzerland.

The class is so named because it was the third class of railcars of the Swiss locomotive and railcar classification type ABe 4/4 to be acquired by the Rhaetian Railway. According to that classification system, ABe 4/4 denotes an electric railcar with first and second class compartments and a total of four axles, all of which are drive axles.

Acquired in 1988 and 1990, the six railcars in the class are numbered 51 to 56.  They operate on the 1,000 V DC powered Bernina Railway, where they have helped to cope with increasing traffic.  Over the years, they have also displaced the earlier ABe 4/4 I class railcars into lower level services.

Technical details
The ABe 4/4 III class was manufactured by the Swiss Locomotive and Machine Works (SLM) and ABB in two series, each of three cars.  They were the first motive power on the Rhaetian Railway to use frequency changer technology together with AC induction motors.  In addition, they were the world's first DC-powered railway vehicles with GTO thyristors.

The ABe 4/4 IIIs are also equipped with 12 seats in first class, and 16-second class seats.

Thanks to multiple-unit train control, each individual railcar can be operated in combination with other members of the class, and also with older ABe 4/4 II class railcars, as well as Gem 4/4 class electro-diesel locomotives.  Much use is made of the ABe 4/4 IIIs' multiple-unit control systems in the Bernina Railway's daily operations.  The combined operation of two ABe 4/4 IIIs under multiple unit control theoretically leaves sufficient power reserves for the haulage of no more than a further , as the maximum towing capacity of  cannot be exceeded.

As of 2018, it was rumoured that one ABe 4/4 III of the first batch in 1988 is set to be preserved by Rhb Historic as part of their fleet but the number hasn't been decided upon yet.

Livery

For the ABe 4/4 III class of railcars, the Rhaetian Railway chose a livery that corresponds with that of the Ge 4/4 I, Ge 4/4 II and Ge 4/4 III class electric locomotives.  The dominant colour of the railcar bodies in this livery is red.  Each cab front is emblazoned with a Graubünden coat of arms.  Underneath a low level white coloured cheat line surrounding the railcar bodies, the chassis is dark grey.  This livery was also subsequently applied to the ABe 4/4 II class railcars and the Gem 4/4 locomotives.

Apart from its traffic number, each member of the class carries the name of a community and its coat of arms.

In 2007, ABe 4/4 III no 51 received a special advertising livery publicising the subsequently successful candidature of the Rhaetian Railway in the Albula / Bernina Landscapes for inclusion in the UNESCO World Heritage List.  All other members of the class have since also been painted in an advertising livery.

List of railcars

See also 
 Bernina Express

References

Notes

Literature
 H. Furgler: Triebwagen ABe4 / 4 51 bis 53 für die Bernina-Linie der Rhätische Bahn "Elektrische Bahnen 87 (1987-7)" 
 Hans Furgler: Die neuen Triebwagen ABe 4/4 51-53 für die Bernina-Linie der Rhätischen Bahn. In: Schweizer Eisenbahn-Revue. 6/1988. 
 Claude Jeanmaire "Die elektrischen und Dieseltriebfahrzeuge Schweizerischer Eisenbahn Rhätischen Bahn: Stammnetz - Triebfahrzeuge" (Verlag Eisenbahn)  
 Patrick Belloncle, Gian Brünger, Rolf Grossenbacher, Christian Müller "Das grosse Buch der Rhätischen Bahn 1889 - 2001"  
 Wolfgang Finke, Hans Schweers "Die Fahrzeuge der Rhätischen Bahn 1889-1998 Band 3: Triebfahrzeuge" (SCHWEERS + WALL)  
 Hans-Bernhard Schönborn "Schweizer Triebfahrzeuge" (GeraMond)  

This article is based upon a translation of the German language version as at January 2010.

Multiple units of Switzerland
Rhaetian Railway multiple units
1000 V DC locomotives